Zoltán Végh (born 7 April 1971) is a Hungarian former professional goalkeeper who last played for Ferencvárosi TC.

He was the first-choice goalkeeper for Hungary for several years in the late 1990s, but no longer figures in the national team setup.

Honours

Club Honours
Hungarian League: 2008
Runner-up: 2007
Hungarian Cup
Runners-up: 1997, 2000

Personal Honours
Hungarian League Goalkeeper of the Year: 2006

External links
Végh Zoltán's stats at MTK Hungária FC (in English)

1971 births
Living people
People from Veszprém
Hungarian footballers
Association football goalkeepers
Hungary international footballers
Veszprém LC footballers
Győri ETO FC players
Hapoel Haifa F.C. players
Budapesti VSC footballers
Vasas SC players
MTK Budapest FC players
Fehérvár FC players
Újpest FC players
Ferencvárosi TC footballers
Hungarian expatriate footballers
Expatriate footballers in Israel
Hungarian expatriate sportspeople in Israel
Sportspeople from Veszprém County